Judith Elizabeth McKinlay (née McKenzie; 2 July 1937 – 9 February 2019) was a New Zealand biblical scholar who taught at Knox College, Otago as professor of Old Testament, and as senior lecturer in Old Testament at the University of Otago. McKinlay's special interests were in feminist biblical studies, with a particular focus on female figures in the Old Testament, and postcolonial biblical studies.

Biography
McKinlay was born on 2 July 1937 in Drury, New Zealand. She was the daughter of the Rev Graeme and Esther McKenzie. From 1990 to 1996, she was Professor of Old Testament at Knox College, Otago and from 1997 to 2003, Lecturer and then Senior Lecturer in Old Testament at the University of Otago, and a part-time lecturer there for some years thereafter. Professor Johanna Stiebert describes McKinlay as "internationally known and admired" for her work in feminist and postcolonial biblical scholarship.

Works

Books
Gendering Wisdom the Host: Biblical Invitations to Eat and Drink (1996)
Reframing Her: Biblical Women in Postcolonial Focus (2004)
Troubling Women and Land: Reading Biblical Texts in Aotearoa New Zealand (2014)

References

External links
  - Minutes of the 2021 General Assembly of the Presbyterian Church of Aotearoa New Zealand held electronically Wednesday 29 and Thursday 30 September 2021

1937 births
2019 deaths
Old Testament scholars
New Zealand biblical scholars
New Zealand Presbyterians
New Zealand theologians
Christian feminist biblical scholars
Victoria University of Wellington alumni
University of Otago alumni
Academic staff of the University of Otago